Świerczyna may refer to the following places:
Świerczyna, Opoczno County in Łódź Voivodeship (central Poland)
Świerczyna, Pabianice County in Łódź Voivodeship (central Poland)
Świerczyna, Lublin Voivodeship (east Poland)
Świerczyna, Świętokrzyskie Voivodeship (south-central Poland)
Świerczyna, Leszno County in Greater Poland Voivodeship (west-central Poland)
Świerczyna, Pleszew County in Greater Poland Voivodeship (west-central Poland)
Świerczyna, Drawsko County in West Pomeranian Voivodeship (north-west Poland)
Świerczyna, Koszalin County in West Pomeranian Voivodeship (north-west Poland)